Pánuco de Coronado is one of the 39 municipalities of Durango, in north-western Mexico. The municipal seat lies at Panuco de Coronado. The municipality covers an area of 1059.9 km².

As of 2010, the municipality had a total population of 11,927, up from 11,886 as of 2005. 

As of 2010, the town of Pánuco de Coronado had a population of 1,291. Other than the town of Pánuco de Coronado, the municipality had 58 localities, the largest of which (with 2010 population in parentheses) was: Francisco I. Madero (4,550), classified as urban.

References

Municipalities of Durango